is a former Japanese football player.

Playing career
Yonekura was born in Gunma Prefecture on 28 December 1970. After graduating from high school, he joined NKK in 1989. He played many matches from first season. However the club was relegated to Division 2 in 1991 and he moved to Toyota Motors (later Nagoya Grampus Eight). He became a regular player and the club won the 3rd place in 1995. In 1996, he moved to Cerezo Osaka. However his opportunity to play decreased year by year. In 1998, he could hardly play in the match and retired end of 1998 season.

Club statistics

References

External links

J.League

1970 births
Living people
Association football people from Gunma Prefecture
Japanese footballers
Japan Soccer League players
J1 League players
NKK SC players
Nagoya Grampus players
Cerezo Osaka players
Association football midfielders